
Listed below are executive orders signed by United States President Harry S. Truman. His executive orders are also listed on WikiSource.

Executive orders

1945

1946

1947

1948

1949

References

External links
 Executive Orders Disposition Tables, National Archives, Federal Register

 
United States federal policy
Executive orders of Harry S. Truman
Harry S. Truman-related lists